Carex scabrirostris is a tussock-forming perennial in the family Cyperaceae. It is native to eastern parts of Asia.

See also
 List of Carex species

References

scabrirostris
Plants described in 1905
Taxa named by Georg Kükenthal
Flora of China
Flora of Tibet